Bela anna is a species of sea snail, a marine gastropod mollusk in the family Mangeliidae.

Description
The length of the buff shell attains 10.5 mm, its diameter 4 mm.

Distribution
This marine species occurs off the Agulhas Bank, South Africa

References

External links
  Tucker, J.K. 2004 Catalog of recent and fossil turrids (Mollusca: Gastropoda). Zootaxa 682:1-1295.
   Bouchet P., Kantor Yu.I., Sysoev A. & Puillandre N. (2011) A new operational classification of the Conoidea. Journal of Molluscan Studies 77: 273-308.
  Barnard K.H. (1958), Contribution to the knowledge of South African marine Mollusca. Part 1. Gastropoda; Prosobranchiata: Toxoglossa; Annals of The South African Museum v. 44 p. 73 - 163

Endemic fauna of South Africa
anna